The men's singles of the 2011 Strabag Prague Open tournament was played on clay in Prague, Czech Republic.

The 2011 Strabag Prague Open Open was a men's tennis tournament played on clay in Prague, Czech Republic. 

Jan Hernych was the last edition's champion, but lost to Alexander Bury in the qualifying tournament.
Lukáš Rosol defeated Alex Bogomolov Jr. in the final 7–6(1), 5–2 before Bogomolov retired.

Seeds

Draw

Finals

Top half

Bottom half

External Links
 Main Draw
 Qualifying Draw

Strabag Prague Open - Singles
2011 - Men's Singles